Caecilia disossea is a species of caecilian in the family Caeciliidae. It is found in Ecuador and Peru. Its natural habitats are subtropical or tropical moist lowland forests, plantations, rural gardens, and heavily degraded former forest.

References

disossea
Taxa named by Edward Harrison Taylor
Amphibians described in 1968
Taxonomy articles created by Polbot